Vellinge Municipality (Vellinge kommun) is a municipality in Skåne County in southern Sweden. Its seat is located in Vellinge.

The present municipality is a result of the latest local government reform in Sweden. In 1974 the municipalities of Räng, Vellinge and Månstorp (all three created through amalgamation of even smaller units in 1952) amalgamated with the former Town of Skanör med Falsterbo to form a new Vellinge Municipality.

The municipality is considered to be one of the most economically well-off in Sweden, politically governed by a stable majority of the liberal conservative Moderate Party. Due to its low taxes, Vellinge Municipality is mainly populated by middle-class families, many commuting to Malmö.

Localities
There were eight localities in the municipality in 2018.

All of the urban areas are best characterized as affluent suburbs of the greater Malmö. Skanör-Falsterbo was an important medieval town.

Elections
Below are the results listed from since the 1973 municipal reform. Between 1988 and 1998 the Sweden Democrats' results were not published by the SCB due to the party's small size nationwide. "Turnout" denotes the percentage of the electorate casting a ballot, but "Votes" only applies to valid ballots cast.

Riksdag

Blocs

This lists the relative strength of the socialist and centre-right blocs since 1973, but parties not elected to the Riksdag are inserted as "other", including the Sweden Democrats results from 1988 to 2006, but also the Christian Democrats pre-1991 and the Greens in 1982, 1985 and 1991. The sources are identical to the table above. The coalition or government mandate marked in bold formed the government after the election. New Democracy got elected in 1991 but are still listed as "other" due to the short lifespan of the party. "Elected" is the total number of percentage points from the municipality that went to parties who were elected to the Riksdag.

References

External links

 Vellinge - Official site

Municipalities of Skåne County
Municipalities in the Øresund Region